Northern Quest Resort & Casino is an Indian casino in Airway Heights, Washington, near Spokane, owned and operated by the Kalispel Tribe. It has a 250-room hotel, a spa, and 14 restaurants and lounges. The casino has  of gaming space, with over 1,600 slot machines, 37 table games, 9 poker tables, a keno parlor, and a racebook.

The spa opened in 2010.

Shows
The casino has hosted many star-studded shows  including Blue Öyster Cult, Santana, Toby Keith, Willie Nelson, BB King, Ringo Starr, Natalie Cole, Art Garfunkel, Sammy Hagar, Kenny Rogers, Miranda Lambert, Kelly Clarkson, Sugarland, Kid Rock, ZZ Top, Heart and Chris Botti, and comedians Lewis Black, Bill Cosby, Jeff Dunham and Jay Leno. The Pavilion also holds occasional amateur cage fighting, and can be reserved for private events.

Northern Quest has also been featured on Friday Night Fights on ESPN2 several times for boxing events.

See also
List of casinos in Washington 
List of casinos in the United States 
List of casino hotels

References

Buildings and structures in Spokane County, Washington
Casinos in Washington (state)
Casinos completed in 2000
Casino hotels
Native American casinos
Tourist attractions in Spokane County, Washington
2000 establishments in Washington (state)